The Keeper of Palaeontology was formerly a palaeontological academic position at the Natural History Museum, London.  The Keeper of Palaeontology served as the Head of the Department of Palaeontology: following reorganisation in 2013 the Departments of Mineralogy and Palaeontology merged to become the Earth Sciences department.

Between 1813 and 1956 the department was known as the Department of Geology, and the head of the department as the Keeper of Geology.

Keepers of Geology
Charles Dietrich Eberhard Konig 1813–1851
George Robert Waterhouse 1851–1880
Henry Woodward 1880–1901
Arthur Smith Woodward 1901–1924
Francis Arthur Bather 1924–1928
William Dickson Lang 1928–1938
Wilfred Norman Edwards 1938–1955
Errol Ivor White  1955–1956

Keepers of Palaeontology
Errol Ivor White 1956–1966
Harold William Ball 1966–1986
Leonard Robert Morrison Cocks 1986–1998
Stephen Kenneth Donovan 1998–2002
Norman MacLeod 2002–2013

References

Natural History Museum, London